SpaceUp is an open-attendance space exploration unconference, where participants decide the topics, schedule, and structure of the event. SpaceUps have been held on both West and East coasts, and in Houston. Common features of SpaceUps are an unconference/barcamp style schedule, Ignite talks, and a moonpie eating contest.

Topics from SpaceUp conferences include: discussion of newspace industry, how to get more people excited about space, and the future direction of NASA, ESA, CSA, JAXA.

History
The first SpaceUp was held at the San Diego Air & Space Museum on February 27–28, 2010.  It was sponsored and organized by the San Diego Space Society. The 2-day event was covered by Spacevidcast and attended by representatives from NASA, Google Lunar X Prize, Masten Space Systems, and Quicklaunch.  This event was organized by Chris Radcliff.  

The second SpaceUp event was held August 27–28, 2010 in Washington, D.C. at George Washington University.  This event was organized by Evadot founder Michael Doornbos.

After several more successful events in the US, the SpaceUp concept crossed the Atlantic in September 2012, with the first SpaceUp unconference in Europe. It was organized by six dedicated space ambassadors at Europlanetarium Genk on 22 and 23 September 2012. SpaceUp Europe triggered several space enthusiasts to organize more European space unconferences, making the concept truly global. SpaceUp Stuttgart in Germany was held 27 October, followed by SpaceUp Poland in Warsaw on 24 and 25 November. SpaceUp London and Paris were held 2013. In December 2012 the concept rolled further East with the first event in Asia, SpaceUp India.

Events

References

External links
 http://www.spaceup.org – Original SpaceUp website (for San Diego)
 http://wiki.spaceup.org
 SPACEUP UNCONFERENCES: A 21ST CENTURY GLOBAL APPROACH TO SPACE OUTREACH, presentation by Andreas Hornig at the 64th International Astronautical Congress 2013 in Beijing (YouTube)
 http://www.spaceupdc.org – SpaceUp DC site
 http://wiki.spaceupdc.org
 http://www.spaceuphouston.org – SpaceUp Houston
 http://wiki.spaceuphouston.org
 http://spaceup.org/near-you/europe/ – SpaceUp Europe
 http://spaceup.org/near-you/europe/
 http://spaceupdenver.org – SpaceUp Denver
 http://spaceupdenver.org
 http://www.spaceup.fr – SpaceUp France: Paris 2013, Toulouse 2014
 http://www.spaceup.fr

Unconferences
Space advocacy organizations